Frontier Battalion may refer to:
 Texas Ranger Division
 Frontier Battalion (Iran)